The Subaru Fleet-X was a concept station wagon made by Fuji Heavy Industries, introduced at the 1999 Tokyo Motor Show.

Concepts
The Fleet-X was designed to be as light as possible, substituting polycarbonate for the rear quarter and tailgate windows. The concept used different colors to identify where lightweight alternate materials were used, including the exterior door skin, hood, and roof panels.

References

External links

Fleet-X
Station wagons
Cars introduced in 1999